Sundown Slim is a 1920 American silent Western film starring Harry Carey.

Plot
"Sundown Slim" Hicks (Harry Carey) leaves his life of hobo-poet and starts in as ranch cook at the Concho cattle ranch owned by Jack Corliss (J. Morris Foster). The adjoining sheep ranch is owned by David Loring (Duke R. Lee). Fadeaway (Charles Le Moyne), a bad cowboy, insults Anita (Mignonne Golden), daughter of the chief sheepherder, and Sundown exacts reprisal. Billy (Ted Brooks), Sundown's pal, is induced by Fadeaway to rob a bank. Sundown takes the blame and goes to jail. In the feud between sheepmen and cattlemen, Billy is nursed by Anita. The two learn to care for each other, and when Sundown is released from jail and goes to Anita, he sees the situation and surrenders her to Billy, again taking up to lone trail.

Cast
 Harry Carey as Sundown Slim
 Genevieve Blinn as Mrs. Fernando
 Ted Brooks as Billy Corliss
 Frances Conrad as Eleanor Loring
 J. Morris Foster as Jack Corliss (as J.M. Foster)
 Mignonne Golden as Anita
 Joe Harris as Fernando (as Joseph Harris)
 Ed Jones as Sheriff
 Duke R. Lee as Loring (as Duke Lee)
 Charles Le Moyne as Fadeaway
 Otto Myers as Bud Shoop (as Otto Meyers)
 Ed Price as Shorty

Still summary
The film was summarized using stills in the January 1921 Film Fun, an American Western film magazine.

See also
 Harry Carey filmography

References

External links

 

1920 films
1920 Western (genre) films
American black-and-white films
Films directed by Val Paul
Silent American Western (genre) films
Universal Pictures films
1920s American films